NRB is an initialism or code that may refer to:

National Reconstruction Bureau, Pakistani government institution for economic recovery and prosperity
National Religious Broadcasters, international association of Christian communicators
Nederlandse Rugby Bond, Dutch rugby union governing body
Nepal Rastra Bank, central bank of Nepal
New Research Building, Harvard University biomedical research facility
Non-rebreather mask, device used for emergency oxygen therapy
Norbury railway station, England (station code NRB)
Nuclear Recycle Board, part of Bhabha Atomic Research Centre in India
People's Republic of Bulgaria (Narodna Republika Balgariya)